The Eiffel Bridge is a bridge over the River Prut and a checkpoint between Moldova and Romania. The bridge is located between Ungheni, Moldova and Ungheni, Romania.

History  
The railway Chişinău-Corneşti-Ungheni (built 1871–1875) was opened on June 1, 1875, by the Russian Empire in preparation for the Russo-Turkish War (1877–1878). Ungheni customs were established in 1875 after putting into operation the Chişinău-Ungheni-Iaşi railroad. The railway Chişinău-Corneşti was already opened in 1873. 

In 1876, after the spring flooding of the river Prut, the railway bridge that linked Bessarabia and Romania was almost destroyed. On , Russian troops entered Romania at Ungheni and, the next day, Russia declared war on the Ottoman Empire. Today, the bridge remains a strategically positioned construction under the supervision of border guards. 

In the nearby city of Iaşi, Gustave Eiffel also built the Grand Hotel Traian (1882).

Gallery

See also  
 Moldovan–Romanian relations
 List of bridges in Moldova
 List of bridges in Romania

Notes

External links  
 Customs Service of the Republic of Moldova 
  Caile Ferate Moldovene, la rascruce de drumuri 

Bridges in Moldova 
Bridges completed in 1877 
Bridges over the Prut 
Railway bridges in Romania 
Railway bridges in Moldova 
Moldova–Romania border crossings 
Romania–Soviet Union relations
Buildings and structures in Iași County
Ungheni
1877 establishments in the Russian Empire
Gustave Eiffel's designs